The 36th Women's Boat Race took place on 29 March 1981. The contest was between crews from the Universities of Oxford and Cambridge and held as part of the Henley Boat Races along a two-kilometre course.

Background
The first Women's Boat Race was conducted on The Isis in 1927.

Race
Oxford won by one second.

See also
The Boat Race 1981

References

External links
 Official website

Women's Boat Race
1981 in English sport
Boat
March 1981 sports events in the United Kingdom
1981 in women's rowing
1981 sports events in London